Sutton Lenore Foster (born March 18, 1975) is an American actress, singer and dancer. She is known for her work on the Broadway stage, for which she has won the Tony Award for Best Actress in a Musical twice, in 2002 for her role as Millie Dillmount in Thoroughly Modern Millie, and in 2011 for her performance as Reno Sweeney in Anything Goes, a role which she reprised in 2021 for a production in London and for which she received a nomination for the Laurence Olivier Award for Best Actress in a Musical. Her other Broadway credits include Little Women, The Drowsy Chaperone, Young Frankenstein, Shrek the Musical, Violet, and The Music Man. On television, Foster played the lead role in the short-lived ABC Family comedy-drama Bunheads from 2012 to 2013. From 2015 to 2021, she starred in the TV Land comedy-drama Younger.

Early life and education
Foster was born on March 18, 1975 in Statesboro, Georgia, and raised in Troy, Michigan. At the age of 15, she was a contestant on the reality competition show Star Search and also auditioned for the cast of The Mickey Mouse Club. She left Troy High School before graduating (she received her diploma via correspondence courses) to join the national tour of The Will Rogers Follies directed by Tommy Tune. She then attended Carnegie Mellon University for one year, but left to pursue a theatrical career full-time. In May 2012, she received an honorary doctorate from Ball State University, "in recognition of her outstanding career in theater, television and music and for her contributions to the educational experience and professional growth of Ball State students." Her older brother, Hunter Foster, is also an actor.

Career

1995–2001: Early career
After touring in the role of Sandy Dumbrowski in the musical Grease throughout 1995, Foster transferred to the Broadway production in 1996. She left to appear in the ensemble of the Broadway musical The Scarlet Pimpernel in 1997, and after that closed she returned as the Star to Be in the revival of Annie. In 1998, Foster appeared in What the World Needs Now at the Old Globe Theatre, before she began touring with Les Misérables as Eponine Thenardier. She then understudied the same role on Broadway in 2000.

Foster left Les Misérables to join the ensemble of Thoroughly Modern Millie in its pre-Broadway run at the La Jolla Playhouse. Original leading lady Kristin Chenoweth landed a television series shortly after rehearsals began and was replaced with Erin Dilly as Millie and Foster as her understudy. After apparent clashes between the creative team, a "mutual" decision was made for Dilly to leave the production. With only nine days remaining before the first preview, Foster took over the role of Millie Dilmount. During a hiatus (before Millie was set to open on Broadway), Foster appeared in Dorian at Goodspeed Musicals, The Three Musketeers at the American Musical Theatre of San Jose, and South Pacific at the Pittsburgh Civic Light Opera.

2002–2010: Breakthrough and stage success
Thoroughly Modern Millie finally opened on Broadway at the Marquis Theatre in 2002, to positive reviews. The New York Daily News reviewer said: "newcomer Sutton Foster, who has the pert look, the silver voice and the dazzling legwork to make an extraordinarily winning Millie." Clive Barnes, reviewing for the New York Post wrote "Newcomer Sutton Foster's own star turn as Millie is perfectly charming, but as a star she doesn't twinkle, glitter or light up Broadway like a Christmas tree defying a July noon. But she has a good voice and is cutely agreeable." The Newsday reviewer wrote: "She has a smile that may remind you of Mary Tyler Moore, the gawky comic precision of the young Carol Burnett, the lyricism of a romantic heroine and a smallish but vibrant voice as accurate as it is expressive. As [Millie], another of New York's prototypical small-town girls with big-city dreams, [Sutton Foster] appears unfazed by the burden of a character created onscreen by Julie Andrews. The newcomer takes the big stage with an uninhibited what-the-heck comfort level and the discipline to go with her instincts." Time Magazine wrote: "she's [Sutton Foster] got the full package: girlish gawkiness and Broadway brass, the legs and the lungs. Foster is a big reason the show is just about the cutest thing to hit Broadway since Annie's dimples, with perkily retro songs by Jeanine Tesori and clever staging by director Michael Mayer..." Foster went on to win the 2002 Tony Award for Best Leading Actress in a Musical, the Drama Desk Award for Outstanding Actress in a Musical, and the Outer Critics Circle Award for Outstanding Actress in a Musical for her performance. During the run, Foster appeared in concert versions of Chess and Funny Girl, before leaving in 2004.

Upon leaving, Foster did a concert version of Snoopy! The Musical and returned to the Pittsburgh Civic Light Opera for a production of Me and My Girl to wrap up the year. In May 2005, Foster co-starred as Jo March opposite Maureen McGovern as Marmee in the musical adaptation of Louisa May Alcott's classic novel Little Women, for which she was nominated for her second Tony Award. The production closed after just a few months.

She returned to Broadway at the Marquis Theatre in May 2006 in The Drowsy Chaperone, a spoof of 1920s musicals. She played Janet van de Graaff, a famous Broadway starlet who opts to forgo a stage career in favor of married life. The musical had a pre-Broadway run at the Ahmanson Theatre, Los Angeles in November to December 2005. Her performance earned her a third Tony nomination.

Foster left the musical in 2007 and co-starred in Mel Brooks' musical adaptation of his film Young Frankenstein as the Swedish yodeling fräulein Inga, first at the Paramount Theatre and then on Broadway from October 2007 to July 2008.

In 2007, Foster guest-starred on the children's musical puppet show Johnny and the Sprites and in a three-episode story arc on the HBO sitcom Flight of the Conchords.

She left the show to play Princess Fiona in Shrek the Musical, which opened on Broadway on December 14, 2008. For this role, Foster won her second Outer Critics Circle Award for Outstanding Actress in a Musical and was nominated for her fourth Tony Award for Best Performance by a Leading Actress in a Musical. She played her final performance on January 3, 2010, when the show closed on Broadway. Foster participated in a reading of a work-in-progress new musical, Bonnie and Clyde: A Folktale, in June 2009. Her brother, Hunter is writing the music for this musical.

Foster's debut solo album Wish was released by Ghostlight Records in February 2009. The songs range from jazz to pop to cabaret to Broadway. In 2010, Foster promoted the album with concert performances in Boston, New York City, Chicago, the Orange County Performing Arts Center in Orange County, California, and Washington, D.C.

Foster starred as Nurse Fay Apple in the New York City Center's Encores! production of Anyone Can Whistle, which played from April 8 to 11, 2010. Foster made her Off-Broadway debut in Paul Weitz's comedy Trust with Zach Braff, Bobby Cannavale and Ari Graynor which began previews July 23, 2010, with an official opening August 12, running through September 12, 2010, at Second Stage Theatre. Foster and Seth Rudetsky participated in the one night only Actors Fund benefit concert version of They're Playing Our Song on August 30, 2010, at the Gerald W. Lynch Theater, John Jay College, New York. The full cast included Efé, Kaitlyn Davidson, Alex Ellis, Maynard, Matt Loehr, and Jesse Nager, and was directed by Denis Jones.

Foster taught a Spring Semester master class at New York University's Tisch School of the Arts Undergraduate Department of Drama, beginning in January 2010. It culminated in a cabaret performance at Joe's Pub in May titled "From Rodgers To Heart". She taught the master class again in Fall Semester 2010, culminating in another performance at Joe's Pub, "Crazy for Gershwin". Both were musically directed by Deborah Abramson. She is now on the faculty of NYU's New Studio on Broadway. Foster taught a week-long master class session at Ball State University (Muncie, IN) in January 2010. She continued her relationship with Ball State in September 2010 by working with students in the classroom, teaching master classes, and performing workshops for students of the Department of Theatre and Dance.

She also guest-starred in an episode of the NBC legal drama Law & Order: SVU (opposite comedian Kathy Griffin), which aired on March 3, 2010.

Foster performed at the 33rd Annual Kennedy Center Honors in a tribute to Jerry Herman, singing "Before the Parade Passes By." She performed at the Kennedy Center Honors the following year in a tribute to Barbara Cook. She made a third appearance at the Kennedy Center Honors in 2013, performing for the tribute to Shirley MacLaine.

Foster performed a concert tour, An Evening With Sutton Foster from September 2010 to May 2011, performing songs from both her Broadway career and her solo album.

2011–2014: Anything Goes and branching out
Foster played Reno Sweeney in the Broadway revival of Anything Goes, which began performances on March 10, 2011, at the Stephen Sondheim Theatre and officially opened on April 7, 2011. Foster won her third Outer Critics Circle Award and second Drama Desk Award and Tony Award for her performance. Foster's final performance was on March 11, 2012, when she was replaced by Stephanie J. Block. Foster left to film the television comedy-drama Bunheads, which premiered on ABC Family on June 11, 2012. Foster played the lead role in this short-lived 2012 ABC Family drama, developed by Amy Sherman-Palladino, the creator of Gilmore Girls. She played former Las Vegas showgirl Michelle, who impulsively marries a man, moves to his small town, and begins teaching ballet lessons at her new mother-in-law's dance studio. She won the Gracie Award and received a nomination at the 3rd Critics' Choice Television Awards for Best Actress in a Comedy Series. The series was cancelled after a single season.

In the spring of 2012, she returned to Ball State, teaching classes, mentoring the interdisciplinary team that wrote the musical The Circus in Winter, and co-directing the Department of Theatre and Dance's Spring 2012 production of The Drowsy Chaperone; she also spoke at commencement and received an Honorary Doctorate of Fine Arts degree for her continued engagement with Ball State students. Foster continued her relationship with Ball State in October 2012, performing in the staged reading of The Circus in Winter at the National Alliance for Musical Theatre's Festival of New Musicals at New World Stages in New York.

In 2013, Foster starred as Kerry in Psych actor James Roday's comedic thriller Gravy. In 2014, she appeared opposite Robin Williams in the comedy The Angriest Man in Brooklyn.

From March to August 2014, Foster starred in the Roundabout Theatre Company production of the musical Violet at the American Airlines Theatre. Foster received her sixth Tony Award nomination for her performance.

2015–present: Younger, London debut, and Broadway return
She made her Carnegie Hall debut in April 2015, with guest appearances from Joshua Henry and Megan McGinnis. This was part of a new tour effort An Evening With Sutton Foster: Broadway In Concert, which continued through 2016.

She returned to Encores! in July 2015 to play Queenie in Andrew Lippa's The Wild Party.

She later was cast as the lead character of Liza Miller in the TV Land single-camera comedy-drama pilot Younger, created by Darren Star. It was originally set to be released January 13, 2015, but she stated on January 31 in an interview at TETA TheatreFest 2015 in Houston, Texas that the release was delayed. The series premiered on March 31, 2015, and was renewed for a second season, which began airing in January 2016, shortly after it was renewed for a third season, set for a release at the end of the year. In July 2016, season three began filming, and the series was renewed for a fourth season. Season three aired to positive reviews in late 2016, and season 4 aired in summer 2017 with further positive reviews.

In 2016, she starred opposite Aaron Tveit and Betty Buckley in the Stephen Schwartz revue Defying Gravity in Australia.

She appeared in the Off-Broadway revival of Sweet Charity as Charity Hope Valentine at the Pershing Square Signature Center from November 2, 2016 (previews) to January 8, 2017.

Also in 2016, Foster played the role of Violet in the miniseries Gilmore Girls: A Year in the Life opposite her ex-husband, Christian Borle. The two perform a musical within the Summer episode about the history of Stars Hollow. She appeared on the game show Match Game, broadcast on ABC in June 2016. She also made guest appearances on The Good Wife and Mad Dogs.

In 2017, she once again returned to Ball State, this time to co-direct the Department of Theatre and Dance's Spring production of Shrek: The Musical.

During December 2017, she performed as a guest artist for the Mormon Tabernacle Choir's annual Christmas concerts.

In December 2017 Foster, along with Jonathan Groff, performed a selection of songs from many shows. This is the "Live From Lincoln Center" performance from The Appel Room at Lincoln Center, which originally aired on PBS on April 20, 2018.

From July through October 2021, Foster reprised her role as Reno Sweeney in Anything Goes at the Barbican Theatre in London, earning rave reviews from British critics. For her performance, Foster was nominated for the Laurence Olivier Award for Best Actress in a Musical. The production was broadcast in UK cinemas on 28 November and 1 December 2021. The recorded performance also played at US cinemas on March 27 and 30, 2022 and later aired on the PBS series Great Performances.

In October 2021, she published a book titled "Hooked," in which she opens up about how she used crafts, specifically cross-stitching, collaging and crocheting, to get through significantly challenging milestones in her life. She shares how using crafts as creative outlets helped her deal with painful experiences in her life and remain present and resilient.

In December 2021, she returned to Broadway, starring as Marian Paroo opposite Hugh Jackman in a revival of The Music Man. For her performance, Foster received her seventh nomination for the Tony Award for Best Actress in a Musical and also won the Drama League Award for Distinguished Performance. The production played its final performance on January 15, 2023.

As of March 2023 she is currently on the faculty of Ball State University as Instructor of Theatre, focusing on internships.

Personal life
Foster met actor Christian Borle in college, and married him on September 18, 2006. The couple divorced in 2009. Foster and Borle still remain friends and continue to support each other's work. On September 19, 2013, Foster confirmed that she became engaged to screenwriter Ted Griffin. She and Griffin married on October 25, 2014. In April 2017, Foster announced that she and her husband adopted a baby girl, born March 5, 2017.

Foster is a self-proclaimed dog lover and has had three dogs since her Broadway debut: Linus, Mabel, and Brody.

She makes artwork which she sells online and occasionally at art exhibits. She has collaborated with visual artist Julien Havard, who previously worked as her dresser for nine years, beginning with Thoroughly Modern Millie.

In December 2021, Foster tested positive for COVID-19 and was forced to miss performances of The Music Man. Her swing, Kathy Voytko, stepped in for her to prevent the show from shutting down.

Filmography

Film

Television

Theatre

Discography

 An Evening with Sutton Foster: Live at the Café Carlyle (2011)
 Wish (2009)
Take Me to the World (2018)

Tours
An Evening with Sutton Foster (2010–11)
An Evening with Sutton Foster: Broadway in Concert (2015–16)

Awards and nominations

Over her career, she has been recognized by the Tony Awards and Laurence Olivier Awards for her work on the Broadway stage and London theatre for:
56th Tony Awards: Best Actress in a Musical, win for Thoroughly Modern Millie in 2002 
59th Tony Awards: Best Actress in a Musical, nomination for Little Women in 2005 
60th Tony Awards: Best Actress in a Musical, nomination for The Drowsy Chaperone in 2006
63rd Tony Awards: Best Actress in a Musical, nomination for Shrek the Musical in 2009
65th Tony Awards: Best Actress in a Musical, win for Anything Goes in 2011
68th Tony Awards: Best Actress in a Musical, nomination for Violet in 2014
75th Tony Awards: Best Actress in a Musical, nomination for The Music Man in 2022
2022 Laurence Olivier Awards: Best Actress in a Musical, nomination for Anything Goes in 2022.

References

External links
 
 
 
 
 
 Article on her role in Thoroughly Modern Millie
 Sutton Foster – Downstage Center interview at American Theatre Wing.org, May 2005
 TonyAwards.com Interview with Sutton Foster
 Riverfront Times interview with Sutton Foster about her upbringing 

1975 births
20th-century American actresses
21st-century American actresses
Actresses from Georgia (U.S. state)
Actresses from Michigan
American female dancers
American dancers
American women singers
American musical theatre actresses
American stage actresses
Carnegie Mellon University College of Fine Arts alumni
Dancers from New York (state)
Drama Desk Award winners
Living people
Singers from Georgia (U.S. state)
Singers from Michigan
New York University faculty
People from Statesboro, Georgia
People from Troy, Michigan
Tony Award winners